The so-called Arian fragment of the Vatican Library, MS 5750, found at the monastic library at Bobbio, is part of a series of fragmented fifth-century palimpsests of fifth-century Arian texts, erased and overwritten in Latin in the ninth century.

Notes 
 

Christian manuscripts
Palimpsests